Elton John's Greatest Hits Volume III is the twenty-seventh album released by English musician Elton John. Released in 1987, 10 years after Elton John's Greatest Hits Volume II, the compilation album features his greatest hits from 1979 to 1986 and was made available only in the United States and Canada. All of the songs featured had previously been released on a previous album.

History
The album was initially released under Geffen Records after John returned to his US label. Geffen was later bought out by MCA Records in 1990. John had just left MCA after the label released Greatest Hits Vol. 2.

One-third of the album is composed of songs from Too Low for Zero, John's 1983 album that received the most critical and commercial acclaim for the early 1980s, including the songs "I Guess That's Why They Call It the Blues" and "I'm Still Standing". Some of the John's less successful songs were also included on the tracking because they had been released in the past year. The album received a gold certification in February 1989, platinum in November 1991, and achieved 2× platinum in October 1995 by the RIAA.

In 1992, two years after MCA purchased Geffen, Greatest Hits Volume III was removed from the artist's repertoire and replaced with the famed Greatest Hits 1976-1986 album, and due to copyright issues, two tracks from Greatest Hits Volume II, "Don't Go Breaking My Heart" and "Sorry Seems to Be the Hardest Word" were moved to Greatest Hits 1976-1986 and replaced with "Tiny Dancer" and "I Feel Like a Bullet (In the Gun of Robert Ford)".

Track listing
All songs are written by Elton John and Bernie Taupin, except where noted.

Credits
Album coordinators – John David Kalodner & Robin Rothman
Originally mastering – Greg Fulginiti
Art direction/Design – Laura Lipuma
Management – John Reid

References

Sources
 
 
 
 
 
 
 
 
 
 
 
 
 
 
 

Albums produced by Gus Dudgeon
Albums produced by Chris Thomas (record producer)
1987 greatest hits albums
Elton John compilation albums
Geffen Records compilation albums
Albums produced by Elton John
Albums produced by Thom Bell